Ypthima congoana is a butterfly in the family Nymphalidae. It is found in the Democratic Republic of the Congo, Zambia, and possibly Angola.

References

congoana
Butterflies of Africa
Lepidoptera of Zambia
Butterflies described in 1955